ΆάΈ
Narad Muni Rana is a Nepalese Politician and was Minister of Forests and Environment . He was serving as the Member Of House Of Representatives (Nepal) elected from Kailali-5 constituency. He is member of the Communist Party of Nepal (UML).

References

Living people
Place of birth missing (living people)
21st-century Nepalese politicians
People from Kailali District
Nepal Communist Party (NCP) politicians
Communist Party of Nepal (Unified Marxist–Leninist) politicians
Nepal MPs 2017–2022
Members of the 1st Nepalese Constituent Assembly
1972 births